The 1975 College Football All-America team is composed of college football players who were selected as All-Americans by various organizations and writers that chose College Football All-America Teams in 1975. The National Collegiate Athletic Association (NCAA) recognizes four selectors as "official" for the 1975 season. They are: (1) the American Football Coaches Association (AFCA); (2) the Associated Press (AP) selected based on the votes of sports writers at AP newspapers; (3) the Football Writers Association of America (FWAA) selected by the nation's football writers; and (4) the United Press International (UPI) selected based on the votes of sports writers at UPI newspapers.  Other selectors included Football News (FN), the Newspaper Enterprise Association (NEA), The Sporting News (TSN), Time magazine, and the Walter Camp Football Foundation (WC).

Three players were unanimously selected by all four official selectors and all five unofficial selectors.  They were running back Archie Griffin of Ohio State, defensive linemen Steve Niehaus of Notre Dame and Lee Roy Selmon of Oklahoma.

The 1975 Oklahoma Sooners football team had eight players who received first-team honors. The Oklahoma honorees were Lee Roy Selmon, receiver Tinker Owens, offensive tackle Mike Vaughan, offensive guard Terry Webb, defensive end Jimbo Elrod, defensive tackle James White, middle guard Dewey Selmon, and return specialist Joe Washington. Ohio State followed with five first-team honorees: offensive guard Ted Smith, quarterback Cornelius Greene, running back and Heisman Trophy winner Archie Griffin, defensive back Tim Fox, and punter Tom Skladany.

Consensus All-Americans
The following chart identifies the NCAA-recognized consensus All-Americans for the year 1975 and displays which first-team designations they received.

Offense

Receivers 

 Steve Rivera, California 
 Larry Seivers, Tennessee 
 Henry Marshall, Missouri 
 Theo Bell, Arizona 
 Don Buckey, N.C. State 
 Larry Dorsey, Tennessee State 
 Dave Logan, Colorado 
 Tinker Owens, Oklahoma 
 Steve Largent, Tulsa 
 Tony Hill, Stanford

Tight ends 

 Bennie Cunningham, Clemson 
 Mike Barber, Louisiana Tech 
 Ken MacAfee, Notre Dame 
 Barry Burton, Vanderbilt 
 Don Hasselbeck, Colorado

Tackles 

 Bob Simmons, Texas 
 Dennis Lick, Wisconsin  
 Rod Walters, Iowa  
 Mark Koncar, Colorado 
 Marvin Powell, USC 
 Mike Vaughan, Oklahoma 
 Brad Oates, BYU 
 Lamar Parrish, Georgia 
 Dan Jiggetts, Harvard

Guards 

 Randy Johnson, Georgia 
 Ted Smith, Ohio State 
 Ken Jones, Arkansas State  
 Joe Devlin, Iowa 
 Terry Webb, Oklahoma  
 Tom Rafferty, Penn State 
 Randy Cross, UCLA 
 Mickey Marvin, Tennessee 
 Ken Long, Purdue 
 Carl Dean, New Mexico State

Centers 

 Rik Bonness, Nebraska 
 Pete Brock, Colorado  
 James Files, McNeese State 
 Ray Pinney, Washington 
 Leo Tierney, Georgia Tech

Quarterbacks 

 John Sciarra, UCLA 
 Craig Penrose, San Diego State  
 Marty Akins, Texas 
 Gene Swick, Toledo 
 Cornelius Greene, Ohio State 
 Jeff Grantz, South Carolina

Running backs 

 Archie Griffin, Ohio State   
 Ricky Bell, USC 
 Chuck Muncie, California 
 Tony Dorsett, Pittsburgh 
 Earl Campbell, Texas 
 Jimmy DuBose, Florida 
 Joe Washington, Oklahoma 
 Gordon Bell, Michigan 
 Louie Giammona, Utah State

Defense

Defensive ends 

 Leroy Cook, Alabama 
 Jimbo Elrod, Oklahoma 
 Troy Archer, Colorado 
 Bob Martin, Nebraska 
 Jimmy Lisko, Arkansas State 
 Duncan McColl, Stanford 
 Kim Bokamper, San Jose State 
 Randy Cozens, Pittsburgh 
 Nate Toran, Rutgers

Defensive tackles 

 Leroy Selmon, Oklahoma  
 Steve Niehaus, Notre Dame  
 Ken Novak, Purdue 
 James White, Oklahoma State 
 Mike Dawson, Arizona 
 Edgar Fields, Texas A&M 
 Gary Jeter, USC 
 Nick Buonamici, Ohio State 
 Bob Baumhower, Alabama

Middle guards 

 Dewey Selmon, Oklahoma 
 Cliff Frazier, UCLA 
 Tim Davis, Michigan 
 Tom Higgins, NC State

Linebackers 

 Ed Simonini, Texas A&M  
 Greg Buttle, Penn State 
 Sammy Green, Florida 
 Kevin McLain, Colorado State  
 Woody Lowe, Alabama 
 Larry Gordon, Arizona State 
 Ray Preston, Syracuse 
 Reggie Williams, Dartmouth 
 Garth Ten Nappel, Texas A&M 
 Brian Ruff, The Citadel 
 Phil Heck, California 
 Calvin O'Neal, Michigan 
 Gary Spani, Kansas State 
 Donnie Thomas, Indiana

Defensive backs 

 Tim Fox, Ohio State 
 Pat Thomas, Texas A&M 
 Chet Moeller, Navy 
 Mike Haynes, Arizona State  
 Don Dufek, Michigan 
 James Hunter, Grambling  
 Kurt Knoff, Kansas 
 Wonder Monds, Nebraska 
 Jim Bolding, East Carolina 
 Lester Hayes, Texas A&M 
 Shafer Suggs, Ball State 
 Danny Reece, USC 
 Bill Armstrong, Wake Forest 
 Tom Marvaso, Cincinnati

Special teams

Kickers 

 Chris Bahr, Penn State 
 Bob Berg, New Mexico 
 Dave Lawson, Air Force

Punters 

 Tom Skladany, Ohio State 
 Rick Engles, Tulsa

Returner 

 Joe Washington, Oklahoma

Key 
 Bold – Consensus All-American
 -1 – First-team selection
 -2 – Second-team selection
 -3 – Third-team selection

Official selectors

 AFCA – American Football Coaches Association
 AP – Associated Press
 FWAA – Football Writers Association of America
 UPI – United Press International

Other selectors

 FN – Football News
 NEA – Newspaper Enterprise Association
 TSN – The Sporting News
 Time – Time magazine
 WC – Walter Camp Football Foundation

See also
 1975 All-Big Eight Conference football team
 1975 All-Big Ten Conference football team
 1975 All-Pacific-8 Conference football team
 1975 All-SEC football team

References 

All-America Team
College Football All-America Teams